This is a list of 300 species in Tachytes, a genus of square-headed wasps in the family Crabronidae.

Tachytes species

 Tachytes abdominalis (Say, 1823) i c g b
 Tachytes abercornensis Arnold, 1959 i c g
 Tachytes absidatus R. Bohart, 1979 i c g
 Tachytes admirabilis R. Turner, 1916 i c g
 Tachytes aeneus E. Saunders, 1910 i c g
 Tachytes aestuans R. Turner, 1916 i c g
 Tachytes agadiriensis Nadig, 1933 i c g
 Tachytes alacer Arnold, 1960 i c g
 Tachytes albonotatus Walker, 1871 i c g
 Tachytes alfierii Pulawski, 1962 i c g
 Tachytes alvarengai R. Bohart, 1979 i c g
 Tachytes amazonus F. Smith, 1856 i c g
 Tachytes ambidens Kohl, 1884 i c
 Tachytes andesae R. Bohart, 1979 i c g
 Tachytes andreniformis Cameron, 1889 i c g
 Tachytes angustiverticis Wu and Li, 2006 i c g
 Tachytes approximatus R. Turner, 1908 i c g
 Tachytes arabicus Guichard, 1994 i c g
 Tachytes archaeophilus Pulawski, 1962 i c g
 Tachytes argentea Gussakovskij, 1933 c g
 Tachytes argenteovestitus Cameron, 1910 i c g
 Tachytes argenteus Gussakovskij, 1933 i
 Tachytes argyreus (F. Smith, 1856) i c g
 Tachytes argyropis de Saussure, 1887 i c g
 Tachytes asiagenes Pulawski, 1962 i c g
 Tachytes assamensis Cameron, 1904 i c g
 Tachytes associatus R. Turner, 1917 i c g
 Tachytes astutus Nurse, 1909 i c g
 Tachytes aureocinctus Cameron, 1905 i c g
 Tachytes aurichalceus Kohl in Schletterer, 1891 i c g
 Tachytes auricomans Bradley, 1919 i c g
 Tachytes aurifex F. Smith, 1858 i c g
 Tachytes auripes Berland, 1942 i c g
 Tachytes aurovestitus F. Smith, 1873 i c g
 Tachytes aurulentus (Fabricius, 1804) i c g b
 Tachytes badius Banks, 1942 i c g
 Tachytes bakeri Williams, 1928 i c g
 Tachytes basilicus (Guérin-Méneville, 1844) i c g
 Tachytes beludzhistanicus Gussakovskij, 1933 i c g
 Tachytes bidens Gussakovskij, 1952 i c g
 Tachytes bilunaris Tsuneki, 1982 i c g
 Tachytes bimetallicus R. Turner, 1917 i c g
 Tachytes birkmanni Rohwer, 1909 i c g
 Tachytes biskrensis E. Saunders, 1910 i c g
 Tachytes braunsi R. Turner, 1917 i c g
 Tachytes bredoi Arnold, 1947 i c g
 Tachytes brevicornis Tsuneki, 1976 i c g
 Tachytes brevipennis Cameron, 1900 i c g
 Tachytes brevis Walker, 1871 i c g
 Tachytes brunneomarginatus Arnold, 1947 i c g
 Tachytes brunneus Pulawski, 1962 i c g
 Tachytes bulawayoensis Bischoff, 1913 i c g
 Tachytes californicus R. Bohart, 1962 i c g
 Tachytes cameronianus Morice, 1897 i c g
 Tachytes carinatus Berland, 1942 i c g
 Tachytes catamarcae R. Bohart, 1979 i c g
 Tachytes cataractae Arnold, 1923 i c g
 Tachytes catarinae R. Bohart, 1979 i c g
 Tachytes celsissimus R. Turner, 1917 i c g
 Tachytes cephalotes Walker, 1871 i c g
 Tachytes ceratophorus Pulawski, 1962 i c g
 Tachytes chelatus R. Bohart, 1962 i c g
 Tachytes chilensis (Spinola, 1851) i c g
 Tachytes chivensis Pulawski, 1962 i c g
 Tachytes chrysocercus Rohwer, 1911 i c g
 Tachytes chrysopyga (Spinola, 1842) i c g
 Tachytes chudeaui Berland, 1942 i c g
 Tachytes cinerascens Arnold, 1935 i c g
 Tachytes codonocarpi Pulawski, 1975 i c g
 Tachytes coloratus R. Bohart, 1979 i c g
 Tachytes columbiae W. Fox, 1892 i c g
 Tachytes comberi R. Turner, 1917 i c g
 Tachytes compactus Arnold, 1951 i c g
 Tachytes concinnus F. Smith, 1856 i c g
 Tachytes confusus Arnold, 1923 i c g
 Tachytes contractus Walker, 1871 i c g
 Tachytes copiosus Arnold, 1945 i c g
 Tachytes corniger Gussakovskij, 1952 i c g
 Tachytes costalis Taschenberg, 1870 i c g
 Tachytes crassus Patton, 1880 i c g b
 Tachytes cressoni Banks, 1942 i c g
 Tachytes danae Arnold, 1923 i c g
 Tachytes decoratus Walker, 1871 i c g
 Tachytes desertus R. Bohart, 1994 i c g b
 Tachytes dichrous F. Smith, 1856 i c g
 Tachytes dilaticornis R. Turner, 1916 i c g
 Tachytes dilwara Nurse, 1903 i c g
 Tachytes diodontus Pulawski, 1962 i c g
 Tachytes discrepans Arnold, 1951 i c g
 Tachytes dispersus R. Turner, 1916 i c g
 Tachytes disputabilis R. Turner, 1917 i c g
 Tachytes distanti R. Turner, 1917 i c g
 Tachytes distinctus F. Smith, 1856 i c g b
 Tachytes dogon Pulawski, 2006 i c g
 Tachytes dubiosus Tsuneki, 1974 i c g
 Tachytes ermineus Banks, 1942 i c g
 Tachytes erynnis R. Turner, 1917 i c g
 Tachytes etruscus (Rossi, 1790) i c g
 Tachytes excellens Cameron, 1912 i c g
 Tachytes exclusus R. Turner, 1917 i c g
 Tachytes exornatus W. Fox, 1894 i c g
 Tachytes famelicus Pulawski, 1962 i c g
 Tachytes fatalis R. Turner, 1916 i c g
 Tachytes fervidus F. Smith, 1856 i c g
 Tachytes fidelis Pulawski, 1962 i c g
 Tachytes flagellarius R. Bohart, 1979 i c g
 Tachytes flagellatus Nurse, 1903 i c g
 Tachytes flavocinereus Arnold, 1945 i c g
 Tachytes floridanus Rohwer, 1920 i c g
 Tachytes formosissimus R. Turner, 1908 i c g
 Tachytes fraternoides R. Bohart, 1979 i c g
 Tachytes fraternus Taschenberg, 1870 i c g
 Tachytes freygessneri Kohl, 1881 i c g
 Tachytes fritzi R. Bohart, 1979 i c g
 Tachytes frontalis F. Smith, 1873 i c g
 Tachytes fruticis Tsuneki, 1964 i c g
 Tachytes fucatus Arnold, 1951 i c g
 Tachytes fulviventris Cresson, 1865 i c g
 Tachytes fulvovestitus Cameron, 1904 i c g
 Tachytes gondarabai (Guiglia, 1943) i c g
 Tachytes gracilicornis Arnold, 1944 i c g
 Tachytes grisselli R. Bohart, 1994 i c g b
 Tachytes guatemalensis Cameron, 1889 i c g b
 Tachytes gyusanus Back and Kim, 2014 i g
 Tachytes habilis R. Turner, 1917 i c g
 Tachytes hades Schrottky, 1903 i c g
 Tachytes hainanensis Wu and Q. Li, 2006 i c g
 Tachytes hamiltoni R. Turner, 1917 i c g
 Tachytes harpax Patton, 1880 i c g
 Tachytes hirsutus F. Smith, 1856 i c g
 Tachytes illabefactus Pulawski, 1962 i c g
 Tachytes imperialis de Saussure, 1867 i c g
 Tachytes indicus Dalla Torre, 1897 i c g
 Tachytes indifferens Arnold, 1945 i c g
 Tachytes indulgens Cheesman, 1937 i c g
 Tachytes inexorabilis R. Turner, 1917 i c g
 Tachytes instabilis R. Turner, 1917 i c g
 Tachytes integer Gussakovskij, 1933 i c g
 Tachytes intermedius (Viereck, 1906) i c g b
 Tachytes interstitialis Cameron, 1900 i c g
 Tachytes irreverens Cheesman, 1937 i c g
 Tachytes irritabilis R. Turner, 1917 i c g
 Tachytes jucundus F. Smith, 1856 i c g
 Tachytes kristenseni R. Turner, 1917 i c g
 Tachytes labilis R. Turner, 1917 i c g
 Tachytes lachesis R. Turner, 1917 i c g
 Tachytes lamborni Arnold, 1934 i c g
 Tachytes lamentabilis Arnold, 1951 i c g
 Tachytes lanuginosus Pulawski, 1962 i c g
 Tachytes latifrons Tsuneki, 1964 i c g
 Tachytes lepidus Arnold, 1929 i c g
 Tachytes leprieuri (Spinola, 1842) c g
 Tachytes leprieurii (Spinola, 1842) i
 Tachytes levantinus Pulawski, 1962 i c g
 Tachytes lingnaui Arnold, 1933 i c g
 Tachytes lissinus R. Bohart, 1979 i c g
 Tachytes longirostris Arnold, 1947 i c g
 Tachytes lugubris Walker, 1871 i c g
 Tachytes maculicornis E. Saunders, 1910 i c g
 Tachytes maerens R. Turner, 1917 i c g
 Tachytes magellanicus Williams, 1928 i c g
 Tachytes maindroni Berland, 1942 i c g
 Tachytes manjikuli Tsuneki, 1963 i c g
 Tachytes maroccanus Pulawski, 1962 i c g
 Tachytes marshalli R. Turner, 1912 i c g
 Tachytes matronalis Dahlbom, 1845 i c g
 Tachytes megaera R. Turner, 1917 i c g
 Tachytes melancholicus Arnold, 1923 i c g
 Tachytes memnon R. Turner, 1916 i c g
 Tachytes menkei R. Bohart, 1979 i c g
 Tachytes meraukensis Cameron, 1911 i c g
 Tachytes mergus W. Fox, 1892 i c g
 Tachytes micantipygus Strand, 1910 i c g
 Tachytes midas Arnold, 1929 i c g
 Tachytes minutior R. Bohart, 1979 i c g
 Tachytes mirus Kohl, 1894 i c g
 Tachytes mitis R. Turner, 1916 i c g
 Tachytes modestus F. Smith, 1856 i c g
 Tachytes monetarius F. Smith, 1856 i c g
 Tachytes mongolicus Tsuneki, 1972 i c g
 Tachytes mutilloides Walker, 1871 i c g
 Tachytes nasicornis Gussakovskij, 1952 i c g
 Tachytes natalensis de Saussure, 1854 i c g
 Tachytes nevadensis R. Bohart, 1962 i c g
 Tachytes nigrescens Berland, 1942 i c g
 Tachytes nigroannulatus Bischoff, 1913 i c g
 Tachytes nigropilosellus (Cameron, 1910) i c g
 Tachytes niloticus R. Turner, 1918 i c g
 Tachytes nitidiusculus (F. Smith, 1856) i c g
 Tachytes nitidulus (Fabricius, 1793) i c g
 Tachytes nomarches Pulawski, 1962 i c g
 Tachytes notabilis R. Turner, 1917 i c g
 Tachytes nudiventris R. Turner, 1917 i c g
 Tachytes obductus W. Fox, 1892 i c g
 Tachytes observabilis Kohl, 1894 i c g
 Tachytes obsoletus (Rossi, 1792) i c g
 Tachytes oppositus R. Turner, 1917 i c g
 Tachytes opulentus Nurse, 1909 i c g
 Tachytes ornatipes Cameron, 1889 i c g
 Tachytes oviventris de Saussure, 1891 i c g
 Tachytes palatus R. Bohart, 1979 i c g
 Tachytes pallidiventris Arnold, 1947 i c g
 Tachytes panzeri (Dufour, 1841) i c g
 Tachytes papuanus Tsuneki, 1983 i c g
 Tachytes parvus W. Fox, 1892 i c g
 Tachytes pennsylvanica Banks, 1921 c g
 Tachytes pennsylvanicus Banks, 1921 i b
 Tachytes pepticus (Say, 1837) i c g
 Tachytes perornatus R. Turner, 1917 i c g
 Tachytes picticornis Arnold, 1945 i c g
 Tachytes plagiatus Walker, 1871 i c g
 Tachytes plutocraticus R. Turner, 1910 i c g
 Tachytes politus R. Bohart, 1979 i c g
 Tachytes popovi Pulawski, 1962 i c g
 Tachytes praedator W. Fox, 1892 i c g
 Tachytes praestabilis R. Turner, 1917 i c g
 Tachytes pretiosus Cameron, 1912 i c g
 Tachytes priesneri Pulawski, 1962 i c g
 Tachytes procerus A. Costa, 1882 i c g
 Tachytes pubescens R. Bohart, 1979 i c g
 Tachytes pulchricornis R. Turner, 1917 i c g
 Tachytes punctuosus Arnold, 1923 i c g
 Tachytes pygmaeus Kohl, 1888 i c g
 Tachytes quinquedens R. Bohart, 1979 i c g
 Tachytes rarus Arnold, 1960 i c g
 Tachytes relucens R. Turner, 1916 i c g
 Tachytes repandus (Fabricius, 1787) i c g
 Tachytes rhodesianus Bischoff, 1913 i c g
 Tachytes rhododactylus Taschenberg, 1870 i c g
 Tachytes rhodogaster R. Bohart, 1979 i c g
 Tachytes richardsi R. Bohart, 1979 i c g
 Tachytes roraimae R. Bohart, 1979 i c g
 Tachytes rubellus R. Turner, 1908 i c g
 Tachytes rubioi R. Bohart, 1979 i c g
 Tachytes rufalaris R. Bohart, 1979 i c g
 Tachytes rufipalpis Cameron, 1904 i c g
 Tachytes rufiscutis R. Turner, 1918 i c g
 Tachytes rufomarginatus Arnold, 1945 i c g
 Tachytes rugulosus R. Bohart, 1979 i c g
 Tachytes sacricola Pulawski, 1962 i c g
 Tachytes sagani Guiglia, 1943 i c g
 Tachytes saharicus Pulawski, 1962 i c g
 Tachytes salvus Kohl, 1906 i c g
 Tachytes saundersii Bingham, 1897 i c g
 Tachytes sayi Banks, 1942 i c g
 Tachytes schlingeri R. Bohart, 1979 i c g
 Tachytes sculleni R. Bohart, 1962 i c g
 Tachytes sedulus F. Smith, 1860 i c g
 Tachytes seminole Banks, 1942 i c g
 Tachytes separabilis R. Turner, 1917 i c g
 Tachytes setiger Kohl, 1898 i c g
 Tachytes setosus Taschenberg, 1870 i c g
 Tachytes sexdens R. Bohart, 1979 i c g
 Tachytes sheppardi Arnold, 1940 i c g
 Tachytes silverlocki R. Turner, 1917 i c g
 Tachytes silvicola Williams, 1928 i c g
 Tachytes silvicoloides Williams, 1928 i c g
 Tachytes simillimus von Schulthess, 1926 i c g
 Tachytes simulans F. Smith, 1873 i c g
 Tachytes simulatrix R. Turner, 1917 i c g
 Tachytes sinensis F. Smith, 1856 i c g
 Tachytes sinuatus Pulawski, 1962 i c g
 Tachytes sjoestedti Cameron, 1908 i c
 Tachytes spatiosus T. Li, Cai and Q. Li, 2008 i c g
 Tachytes spatulatus W. Fox, 1892 i c g
 Tachytes stangei R. Bohart, 1979 i c g
 Tachytes sulcatus R. Turner, 1916 i c g
 Tachytes surigensis Williams, 1928 i c g
 Tachytes tabrobanae Cameron, 1900 i c g
 Tachytes tachyrrhostus de Saussure, 1854 i c g
 Tachytes tarsalis (Spinola, 1839) i c g
 Tachytes testaceinervus Cameron, 1908 i c g
 Tachytes tomentosus Kohl in Schletterer, 1891 i c g
 Tachytes toyensis Tsuneki, 1971 i c g
 Tachytes transvaalensis Cameron, 1905 i c g
 Tachytes trichopygus Pulawski, 1962 i c g
 Tachytes tricinctus (Fabricius, 1804) i c g
 Tachytes trigonalis de Saussure, 1867 i c g
 Tachytes turneri Arnold, 1923 i c g
 Tachytes ugandensis R. Turner, 1917 i c g
 Tachytes ustulatus R. Bohart, 1979 i c g
 Tachytes vagus Radoszkowski, 1877 i c g
 Tachytes validus Cresson, 1873 i c g b
 Tachytes vardyi R. Bohart, 1979 i c g
 Tachytes varians (Fabricius, 1804) i c g
 Tachytes vechti Tsuneki, 1976 i c g
 Tachytes velox F. Smith, 1856 i c g
 Tachytes venezuelae R. Bohart, 1979 i c g
 Tachytes versatilis R. Turner, 1917 i c g
 Tachytes vestitus (F. Smith, 1873) i c g
 Tachytes vicinus Cameron, 1889 i c g
 Tachytes villegasi R. Bohart, 1979 i c g
 Tachytes vischnu Cameron, 1889 i c g
 Tachytes volubilis R. Turner, 1917 i c g
 Tachytes werneri R. Bohart, 1994 i c g
 Tachytes willinki R. Bohart, 1979 i c g
 Tachytes xenoferus Rohwer, 1911 i c g
 Tachytes yerburyi Bingham, 1897 i c g
 Tachytes yunnanensis T. Li, Cai and Q. Li, 2008 i c g
 Tachytes zuliae R. Bohart, 1979 i c g

Data sources: i = ITIS, c = Catalogue of Life, g = GBIF, b = Bugguide.net

References

Tachytes